Tomás Lim de la Rosa (September 18, 1921 – December 2, 1992), also known for his screen name Jaime de la Rosa was a Filipino actor and politician active from the 1940s to 1960.

Early life
Tomás de la Rosa was the first screen name he used, later changing it to Jaime. Born in Lubao, Pampanga on September 18, 1921.

Personal life
He is the younger brother of Rogelio dela Rosa and became one of LVN Pictures's bankable stars. He was married to Beatriz S. Dela Rosa (December 5, 1922 – September 18, 2000). He has Spanish and Chinese ancestry.

Death
De la Rosa died on December 2, 1992.
He was buried in Loyola Memorial Park in Marikina

Filmography
1939 -Mga Anak ng Lansangan - Eastern Pictures
1940 -Cadena de amor - Sanggumay Pictures
1940 -Bawal na Pag-ibig - Parlatone Hispano-Filipino
1940 -Kahapon Lamang - Sampaguita Pictures
1941 -Ibong Sawi - Excelsior Pictures
1946 -Garrison 13 - Lvn Pictures
1946 -Aladin  - Lvn Pictures
1947 -Bagong Manunubos  - Lvn Pictures
1947 -Ikaw ay Akin  - Lvn Pictures
1947 -Binatang Taring  - Lvn Pictures
1947 -Romansa   - Lvn Pictures
1948 -Engkantada   - Lvn Pictures
1948 -Krus na Bituin   - Lvn Pictures
1948 -Waling-Waling  - Lvn Pictures
1948 -Hamak na Dakila   - Lvn Pictures
1948 -Tanikalang papel    - Lvn Pictures
1948 -Malikmata - Fernardo Poe Pictures
1949 -Parola   - Lvn Pictures
1949 -Gitano   - Lvn Pictures
1949 -Tambol Mayor   - Lvn Pictures
1949 -Padre Burgos - Premiere Production
1949 -Biglang Yaman   - Lvn Pictures
1949 -Batalyon XIII    - Lvn Pictures
1950 -Nuno sa Punso   - Lvn Pictures
1950 -Kontrabando   - Lvn Pictures
1950 -In Despair    - Lvn Pictures
1951 -Reyna Elena    - Lvn Pictures
1951 -Satur    - Lvn Pictures
1951 -Anak ng Pulubi    - Lvn Pictures
1951 -Shalimar    - Lvn Pictures
1951 -Probinsiyano   - Lvn Pictures
1951 -Amor mio    - Lvn Pictures
1952 -Korea    - Lvn Pictures
1952 -Sa Paanan ng Nazareno    - Lvn Pictures
1952 -Digmaan ng Damdamin    - Lvn Pictures
1952 -Taong Paniki    - Lvn Pictures
1952 -Kabalyerong Itim    - Lvn Pictures
1952 -Haring Solomon   - Lvn Pictures
1953 -Loida    - Lvn Pictures
1953 -Dyesebel  - Premiere Production & Manuel Vistan Jr.
1953 -Batanguena   - Lvn Pictures
1954 -Dalawang Panata    - Lvn Pictures
1954 -Virtuoso    - Lvn Pictures
1954 -Doce Pares    - Lvn Pictures
1954 -Donato    - Lvn Pictures
1954 -Tinalikdang Dambana    - Lvn Pictures
1954 -Galawgaw    - Lvn Pictures
1955 -Saydwok Bendor   - Lvn Pictures
1955 -Niña Bonita   - Lvn Pictures
1955 -Dinayang Pagmamahal   - Lvn Pictures
1956 -No Money..No Honey    - Lvn Pictures
1956 - Luksang Tagumpay - Lvn Pictures
1956 -Medalyong Perlas    - Lvn Pictures
1956 -Kumander 13   - Lvn Pictures
1957 -Hukom Roldan   - Lvn Pictures
1957 -Turista   - Lvn Pictures
1958 -Faithful   - Lvn Pictures

References

External links

1921 births
1992 deaths
Filipino male film actors
Filipino people of Chinese descent
Filipino people of Spanish descent
Kapampangan people
20th-century Filipino male actors